New Hampshire Mountaineers was an American soccer team based in Manchester, New Hampshire, United States. Founded in 2009, the team played in the National Premier Soccer League (NPSL), a national amateur league at the fourth tier of the American Soccer Pyramid, in the Northeast Atlantic Division. However prior to the start of the 2011 season, the team folded.

The team played its home games in the stadium at Southern New Hampshire University with the colors navy blue and gold.

History

Players

2010 Roster
Source:

Year-by-year

Head coaches
 Marc Hubbard

Stadia
 Stadium at Southern New Hampshire University; Manchester, New Hampshire (2010)

External links
 Official Site

Association football clubs established in 2009
National Premier Soccer League teams
Soccer clubs in New Hampshire
2009 establishments in New Hampshire
2011 disestablishments in New Hampshire
Association football clubs disestablished in 2011